Talovaya is a rural locality (a village) in Verkhnekhavskoye Rural Settlement, Verkhnekhavsky District, Voronezh Oblast, Russia. The population was 104 as of 2010.

Geography 
Talovaya is located 6 km south of Verkhnyaya Khava (the district's administrative centre) by road. Verkhnyaya Khava is the nearest rural locality.

References 

Rural localities in Verkhnekhavsky District